Klaipėda University DSC Žuvėdra (literally: tern) is a dancesport formation dance team since 1995 affiliated with Klaipėda University, Klaipėda, Lithuania. It is a 7-time world champion and 9-time European champion. It was founded in 1965 by ballroom dancer Ona Skaistutė Idzelevičienė. She and her husband Romaldas Idzelevičius (since 1971) are the primary trainers.

Since 1989, the team participated in World and European Championships. During 1995–2006, it was in the top 3 in European and World Latin Formation Championships, taking world first places in 2002–05. In 2006–13, the club formed the second team that participated in most important competitions. Besides competitions, the team performed at various events in many European countries. In total, the team performed 14 different compositions (music by composer Audrius Balsys since 1997, costumes by Aina Zinčiukaitė since 1999).

The team did not compete in the 2014 season as, after retirement of a cohort of experienced dancers in 2012–13, there were not enough replacements. In a press interview, the trainers blamed a higher education reform that made it more difficult for potential dancers to get admitted to Klaipėda University. Additionally, the team faced financial difficulties: it could not offer stipends to its dancers, only small discounts on tuition fees. Therefore, dancers had to balance studies, work, and practice.

Championship results

See also 
 International DanceSport Federation
 XS Latin

References

External links
 About Žuvėdra
 About Zuvedra

Ballroom dance
Lithuanian dances
Performing groups established in 1965
Formation dance teams